Svitlana Serhiïvna Prokopova  (Світлана Сергіївна Прокопова; born ) is a Ukrainian group rhythmic gymnast. She represents her nation at international competitions.

Prokopova participated at the 2012 Summer Olympics in London.
She competed at world championships, including at the 2011 and at the 2013 World Rhythmic Gymnastics Championships, winning the silver medal in the bronze in the 10 clubs event.

References

External links

1993 births
Living people
Ukrainian rhythmic gymnasts
Place of birth missing (living people)
Gymnasts at the 2012 Summer Olympics
Olympic gymnasts of Ukraine
Sportspeople from Donetsk
Medalists at the Rhythmic Gymnastics World Championships
Universiade medalists in gymnastics
Universiade silver medalists for Ukraine
Universiade bronze medalists for Ukraine
Medalists at the 2013 Summer Universiade
21st-century Ukrainian women